Shown here are all the major rivers and tributaries of Ireland with their lengths (in kilometres and miles). Starting with the Northern Ireland rivers, and going in a clockwise direction, the rivers (and tributaries) are listed in regard to their entry into the different seas: the Irish Sea, the Celtic Sea and the Atlantic Ocean. Also shown are two tables. Table 1 shows the longest rivers in Ireland with their lengths (in kilometres and miles), the counties they flow through, and their catchment areas (in square kilometres). Table 2 shows the largest rivers in Ireland (by mean flow) in cubic metres per second.

The river develops into three lakes along its course, Lough Allen, Lough Ree and Lough Derg. Of these, Lough Derg is the largest. The Shannon enters the Atlantic Ocean at the Shannon Estuary. Other major rivers include the River Liffey, River Lee, River Swilly, River Foyle, River Lagan, River Erne, River Blackwater, River Nore, River Suir, River Barrow (The Three Sisters), River Bann, River Slaney, River Boyne, River Moy and River Corrib.

Longest Irish Rivers (with Basin areas) 
Lengths obtained from the Ordnance Survey of Ireland: Rivers and their Catchment Basins 1958 (Table of Reference), and for the rivers Bann and Erne - Notes on River Basins by Robert A. Williams

TABLE 1

a 
 The River Shannon is a traditional freshwater river for just about 45% of its total length.

b 
 The total basin area of the Three Sisters (Barrow, Nore and Suir) is 9,207 km2.

c
 The traditional length given for the River Bann is 80 miles (129 km) which is the combined total length of Upper and Lower Bann rivers and doesn't include Lough Neagh.
 The total length of the Ulster Blackwater from its source to the sea via L. Neagh and the Lower Bann is 186.3 km (115.75 mi), surpassed, in Ireland, only by the Shannon and Barrow rivers.  This is the longest stream flow (source to sea) in Ulster.

d 
 The total basin area of the 6 km River Corrib is 3,138 km2
This is the longest stream flow (source to sea) within the Corrib Basin.

Largest Irish Rivers (by flow) 
 TABLE 2

a The River Shannon's 209 m3/s is to Limerick City (Catchment area: 11,700 km2). If the discharges from all of the rivers and streams into the Shannon Estuary (including the rivers Feale 34.6m3/s, Maigue 15.6m3/s, Fergus 25.7m3/s, and Deel 7.4m3/s) are added to the discharge at Limerick giving a total catchment of 16,865 km2, the total discharge of the River Shannon at its mouth at Loop Head reaches 300 m3/s

b The River Bann's 92 m3/s is to Movanagher Gauging station (Basin area 5209.8 km2). The 102.5 m3/s is based on the total basin area of 5808 km2
.

c The Three Sisters (Barrow, Nore & Suir) total flow into Waterford Harbour is 154 m3/s and the combined flow of the Barrow and Nore rivers is 86 m3/s before joining the river Suir near Waterford City.

Rivers in Ulster
With length in miles (and km)

River Crana 
River Lennon (Leannan) 
River Foyle  (total) — that portion named "Foyle" forms the border between the Republic of Ireland and Northern Ireland
Burn Dale (also known as the River Deele) - rises in and flows through the east of County Donegal - 
River Finn (Foyle tributary) — rises and flows mainly through County Donegal, Republic of Ireland 
River Reelan 
River Mourne
River Derg 
Mournebeg River 
Owenkillew River 
Glenelly River 
Owenreagh River 
River Strule 
Camowen River 
Drumragh River 
Fairy Water 
Drumquin River 
Routing Burn 
Owenreagh River 
Cloghfin River 
River Faughan 
River Roe 
River Bann 
River Blackwater 
River Callan 
Oona Water 
River Torrent 
River Tall 
River Blackwater (Northern) 
River Main 
Six Mile Water 
Ballinderry River 
Moyola River 
Clady River
Knockoneil River
Grillagh River
Agivey River
Cusher River 
Clady River
Altmore River
Cromore Burn
Devlin River
Cronaniv Burn
River Dun
River Bush 
River Erne  (See Atlantic rivers)
River Lagan 
River Farset 
Blackstaff River
River Quoile 
Clanrye (Newry) River

Rivers in the Republic of Ireland, flowing into the Irish Sea
With length in miles (and km)

Castletown River 
Cully Water 
Kilcurry River 
River Fane 
River Glyde 
River Dee, County Louth 
River Boyne 
River Owenroe (Moynalty) 
River Blackwater, Kildare and Meath 
River Blackwater, Cavan and Meath 
Moynalty River 
Athboy River 
Stonestown River 
Dale River 
Kinnegad River 
Yellow River 
River Tolka 
River Liffey 
Kings River 
Morell River 
River Rye 
Lyreen River
River Camac
River Poddle
River Dodder 
Owendoher River
River Dargle 
River Vartry 
River Avoca (Ovoca) 
River Avonmore 
River Avonbeg 
Aughrim River 
River Slaney 
Derreen River 
River Derry 
River Bann (Wexford)

Rivers in the Republic of Ireland, flowing into the Celtic Sea
With length in miles (and km)

River Barrow 
Philipstown River 
Figile River 
River Slate 
River Triogue 
Finnery River 
Tully Stream 
River Greese 
Burren River 
River Nore 
River Erkina 
River Goul 
River Dinan 
Kings River 
River Suir 
River Drish 
River Clodiagh 
Aherlow River 
River Ara 
River Anner 
John's River
River Tar 
River Duag
River Colligan 
River Mahon 
River Blackwater, Cork 
River Owentaraglen 
River Allow 
River Funshion 
River Finisk 
River Awbeg 
River Dalua 
River Bride 
River Womanagh 
Owenacurra River 
Glashaboy River 
River Lee 
River Sullane 
Shournagh River 
River Bride 
River Bandon 
River Ilen 
Argideen River 
River Owenabue

Rivers in the Republic of Ireland, flowing into the Atlantic Ocean
With length in miles (and km)

Roughty River  (flowing into Kenmare Bay) at Kenmare
River Laune 
River Flesk 
Gweestin River 
Caragh River 
River Inny (Kerry)  
Cummeragh River 
River Ferta
River Carrowbeg
River Maine 
Brown Flesk 
River Feale 
River Galey 
Allaghaun River 
Smerlagh (Smaorlagh) River 
Shanow River 
River Shannon 
Owenmore River (County Cavan) 
Arigna River 
Feorish River 
River Brosna 
Clodiagh River 
Tullamore River 
Silver River 
Bunowen River 
Little Brosna River 
River Camcor 
Ballyfinboy River 
Nenagh River 
 Ollatrim River 
River Inny 
River Tang 
River Suck 
River Shiven 
Boyle River (Total) 
Boyle River 
Lung River 
Breedoge River 
Camlin River 
Mulkear River 
Bilboa River 
River Deel 
River Maigue 
River Fergus 
River Corrib 
Cregg River (via Lough Corrib)
River Clare (via Lough Corrib) 
Grange River 
Abbert River 
River Black 
Aille River (Connacht) 
Baelanabrack River 
River Robe (via Loughs Mask and Corrib) 
River Clarin 
 Clady River
 Cromore Burn
 Cronaniv Burn
Kilcolgan River 
Dooyertha River 
Kinvarra River
River Doonbeg 
River Inagh  
Carrowbeg River 
Bunowen River 
River Erriff 
Owenglin River 
Ballynahinch River 
Cashla River 
Owenboliska River 
Glenamoy River 
Cloonaghmore River 
Owenmore River (County Mayo) (incl. Carrowmore Lake) 
Owenduff River 
Newport River 
River Moy 
Deel River 
Manulla River 
Gweestion River 
Owengarve River 
River Glore 
Easky River, County Sligo 
Ballisodare River 
Owenmore River (County Sligo) 
Owenbeg River 
Unshin River 
River Garavogue (including L. Gill and R. Bonnet) 
River Erne  — mainly formed by Upper and Lower Lough Erne in County Fermanagh, Northern Ireland
River Annalee 
River Cladagh (including Arney) 
Sillees River 
River Ballinamallard 
River Swanlinbar 
River Woodford 
Dromore River 
Yellow River 
Colebrooke River 
Finn River (County Fermanagh and County Monaghan) 
Owenea River 
Oily River 
Bungosteen River 
Ballintra River 
River Eske 
Drumenny Burn
River Gweebarra 
River Swilly

See also

List of rivers in Ireland
List of canals in Ireland
List of loughs in Ireland
List of rivers in County Dublin
Geography of Ireland
Transport in Ireland

References

External links
Irish whitewater River Guides

 
 Ireland
Drainage basins of Ireland